Club Atlético Newell's Old Boys  is an Argentine sports club based in Rosario, Santa Fe. The club was founded on 3 November 1903, and is named after Isaac Newell of the English county of Kent, one of the pioneers of Argentine football.

A founding member of Liga Rosarina de Football, the club affiliated to the Argentine Football Association (AFA) in 1939. Since then, Newell's Old Boys has taken part in tournaments organised by the body. The club has won six Argentine Primera División championships plus three National cups throughout their history. Newell's has also been twice Copa Libertadores runner-up (in 1988 and 1992).

The club's football stadium is the Estadio Marcelo Bielsa, named after the team's former player and manager Marcelo Bielsa (twice champion, and runner-up of one Copa Libertadores). Newell's plays the Rosario derby against Rosario Central, a club with which they have a huge historical rivalry.

Newell's is also notable for its youth divisions, being one of the clubs with most national titles in AFA's youth tournaments. Players from the club's youths who have represented Argentina at World Cups are Gabriel Batistuta, Éver Banega, Walter Samuel, Américo Gallego, Jorge Valdano, Gabriel Heinze, Roberto Sensini, Mauricio Pochettino and Maxi Rodríguez, among others. Lionel Messi also played in the club's youths, but left at a young age to Barcelona to seek treatment for his growth hormone deficiency, while Diego Maradona played briefly for the first team in 1993.

Other sports practised at this club are basketball, boxing, field hockey, martial arts, roller skating, volleyball and American football.

History

Origins

Club Atlético Newell's Old Boys was established on 3 November 1903. Claudio Newell was one of the founding members. Newell called teachers, pupils and alumni of the school his father had established to sign the act of foundation of the club. The name chosen paid tribute to Isaac Newell's life. The first president was Víctor Heitz.

The name "old boys" refers to former pupils of a school. In fact, the players of the first football team were graduates of the school Isaac Newell had established, the Colegio Comercial Anglicano Argentino.

The colours of the club were taken from the Colegio Comercial Anglicano Argentino emblem (designed by Isaac Newell himself) that were red and black inspired in the colours of the flag of England and the Flag of the German Empire.

Newell's Old Boys is often referred to as "leprosos" ("lepers"). The club got its nickname, the lepers, after playing in a charity match for a leprosy clinic in the 1920s.

Liga Rosarina (1905–1930)

On 30 March 1905, the Liga Rosarina de Football (Rosarian Football League) was established, following a proposal by Newell's president Heitz, who invited representatives of Rosario Athletic, Rosario Central and Atlético Argentino for that purpose. The main objective was to organise a championship, so a trophy was donated by the intendant of Rosario, Santiago Pinasco. The trophy was later named in his honour. Newell's was the winner of the first edition, having won eight games and finishing unbeaten. The team also scored 39 goals, conceding just 4.

Previously, the historic first Rosarino derby had been held. Newell's won 1–0 with a goal scored by Faustino González. The next year Newell's won its second championship.

In 1907, the Liga Rosarina established a second division. The Copa Santiago Pinasco tournament moved to that division and "Copa Nicasio Vila" (named in honour of then mayor of Rosario) was created to be played by the first division teams. Newell's won the first edition of this trophy, which they won a total 9 times between 1907 and 1930.

The Copa de Honor Municipalidad de Buenos Aires allowed teams from Buenos Aires and Rosario to take part in the competition. Newell's won the 1911 edition defeating Porteño 3–2 at the final. Other trophy were teams of both cities played together was the Copa Dr. Carlos Ibarguren, won by Newell's in 1921, defeating Huracán by 3–0.

The arrival to Primera División

In 1939, Newell's asked the Argentine Football Association to play in the Primera División championship. The AFA accepted the request, so Newell's played its first tournament in 1939, along with Rosario Central which was also added to the competition. Despite playing in the national tournaments, Newell's continued participating in the regional leagues of Rosario, but with youth amateur players. Newell's debuted in the AFA tournaments on 19 March 1939, defeating San Lorenzo by 2–1. The line-up was: Heredia; Gilli, Soneyro; Sisniega, Perucca, Reynoso; Belén, Fabrini, Gómez, Franco, Sánchez.

National titles

Newell's Old Boys have won the Primera División championship six times (1974 Metropolitano, 1987–88, 1990–91, 1992 Clausura, Apertura 2004 and 2013 Final) and were the runners-up of the Copa Libertadores de América twice (1988 and 1992). The 1990–91 championship was contested between the 1990 Apertura (Newell's) and 1991 Clausura (Boca Juniors) champions, which Newell's won in home-and-away matches. Even though the 1990 Apertura was not considered official by itself, it is considered by Newell's supporters to be their "seventh" championship.

Newell's also won a friendly youth mini-tournament called the Little World Cup in 1988, against River Plate, Milan, Juventus, Real Madrid and Manchester United, and is, together with Boca Juniors, San Lorenzo and Racing Club one of the few Argentine clubs that made a long and successful tour in Europe (in 1949), in which they defeated several important teams such as Valencia, Borussia Mönchengladbach, Real Madrid and the Spanish National "A" Team. These are the only major international achievements of the club until now (although several minor international summer tournaments were won, with the 1943 Copa de Oro Rioplatense standing up). So far the club has not won an official international championship.

Newell's Old Boys is one of a very few teams to have had all their players represent the national team in a single game, when they represented Argentina in a Pre-Olympic Tournament with their undefeated reserve team. It finished third in America, after Brazil and Uruguay.

The team has also contributed a great number of players to the Argentina national team, and exported many players to Europe's top leagues, mostly to Italy and Spain. Among its great players were Gabriel Batistuta, Abel Balbo, Jorge Valdano, Américo Gallego, Mario Zanabria, Gustavo Dezotti, Roberto Sensini, Walter Samuel, Mauricio Pochettino, René Pontoni, Gerardo Martino, Ángel Perucca and several more. It has recently produced Argentine internationals Gabriel Heinze, Maxi Rodríguez and Lionel Messi.

The club's president is Eduardo Bermúdez who was elected during 2016.

Kit and badge

Uniforms

Colors and badge 

The origins of Newell's Old Boys colors can be traced to the 19th century, when Isaac Newell founded the "Colegio Comercial Anglicano Argentino" in 1884. The school's coat of arms had four panels, each depicting a different element, such as Mercury wings, a lamp (representing wisdom), the flag of the United Kingdom, and the flag of Argentina.

The black and red colors used in the coat were extracted from the flags of the United Kingdom (where Newell was born) and the German Empire (country of origin of his wife, Anna Jockinsen).

The red and black colors would be also adopted by the club as its colors. The first NOB emblem was designed by Ernesto Edwards, and (with few variations) has remained since then.

Stadium

The Newell's Old Boys stadium has been in the Parque Independencia neighborhood of Rosario since 1911, and is commonly called El Coloso del Parque (the Colossus of the Independence Park). The capacity was increased from 31,000 to 42,000 in 1997. On 22 December 2009 the stadium was renamed after Marcelo Bielsa, in honour of the former player and coach of the team.

Players

Current squad

Out on loan

Individual records

Most appearances

Top scorers

Managers

  Manuel Fleitas Solich (June 1944–45)
  William Reaside (1947)
  René Pontoni (1956–57)
  Ángel Tulio Zof (1965–67), (1969)
  César Luis Menotti (1971)
  Raúl Oscar Belén (1973)
  Juan Eulogio Urriolabeitía (1973)
  José Yudica (1976–77), (1978–79)
  Luis Cubilla (1 Jan 1980 – 31 Dec 1980)
  Jorge Solari (1983–87)
  José Yudica (1987–90)
  Marcelo Bielsa (1990–1992)
  Eduardo Luján Manera (1993)
  Roque Alfaro (1993)
  Jorge Solari (1993)
  Mario Zanabria (1 July 1996 – 31 Dec 1997)
  Mirko Jozić (1998)
  Ricardo Dabrowski (1 Jan 1998 – 31 Dec 1998)
  Andrés Rebottaro (1999–00)
  Juan Manuel Llop (1 Jan 2001 – 1 Jan 2002)
  Julio Alberto Zamora (2002)
  Héctor Veira (2002–04)
  Américo Gallego (2004)
  Juvenal Olmos (2005)
  Nery Pumpido (1 Oct 2005 – 1 July 2006)
  Pablo Marini (:es) (1 March 2007 – Sept 30, 2007)
  R. Caruso Lombardi (Sept 1, 2007 – 2 Aug 2008)
  Fernando Gamboa (1 Aug 2008 – 1 Jan 2009)
  Roberto Sensini (1 Jan 2009 – 10 April 2011)
  Javier Torrente (18 April 2011 – Sept 27, 2011)
  Diego Cagna (Sept 29, 2011 – 22 Dec 2011)
  Gerardo Martino (29 Dec 2011 – 22 July 2013)
  Alfredo Berti (:es) (24 July 2013 – 11 April 2014)
  Ricardo Lunari (11 April 2014–14)
  Américo Gallego (2014 – 1 June 2015)
  Lucas Bernardi (16 June 2015 – 15 Feb 2016)
  Diego Osella (Feb 2016–Jun 2017)
  Juan Manuel Llop (2017–2018)
  Omar De Felippe (2018)
   Héctor Bidoglio (2018–2019)
  Frank Darío Kudelka (2019–2020)
  Fernando Gamboa (2020–2021)
  Adrián Taffarel (2021–2022)
  Javier Sanguinetti (2022)
  Gabriel Heinze (2022–)

Honours

League
Primera División (6): 1974 Metropolitano, 1987–88, 1990–91, 1992 Clausura, 2004 Apertura, 2013 Final

National cups
Copa de Honor Municipalidad de Buenos Aires (1): 1911
Copa Ibarguren (1): 1921
Copa Adrián C. Escobar (1): 1949

Regional
 Liga Rosarina:
 Copa Nicasio Vila (9): 1907, 1909, 1910, 1911, 1913, 1918, 1921, 1922, 1929
 Copa Santiago Pinasco (2): 1905, 1906
 Asociación Rosarina:
 Trofeo Luciano Molinas (4): 1931, 1933, 1934, 1935 
 Copa Estímulo (2)''': 1925, 1933

Friendly 
 Torneo Internacional Nocturno: 1943

Notes

References

External links

  

 
Association football clubs established in 1903
Basketball teams in Argentina
Argentine volleyball teams
1903 establishments in Argentina
Football clubs in Rosario, Santa Fe
Sports clubs in Rosario
Basketball teams established in 1903
Field hockey clubs in Rosario, Santa Fe